Robot Chicken DC Comics Special 2: Villains in Paradise is an episode of the hit TV show, Robot Chicken and it was aired as a half-hour special during Cartoon Network's Adult Swim on April 6, 2014. It serves as the sequel to the Robot Chicken DC Comics Special that focuses more on the Legion of Doom and is followed by Robot Chicken DC Comics Special III: Magical Friendship.

Synopsis 
List of sketches
 In the opening segment, the DC villains escape from Arkham Asylum, which is being guarded by the characters of Robot Chicken.
 Bizarro has difficulty communicating with a girl scout.
 At the headquarters of the Legion of Doom, the villains have their typical everyday problems while Lex brings his daughter Lena to work at the coffee shop during her Spring Break.
 Superman introduces his "clone", Superboy, to the Justice League.
 Ace the Bat-Hound and a dog dressed like Bane re-enact a running joke from the last special.
 Lex's days from his youth as "Sexx Luthor" are exposed to the Legion of Doom during a meeting.
 Reverse Flash introduces "Reverse Iris" to his enemy and his enemy's girlfriend.
 Batman and Green Lantern try to come up with a less emasculating way for Batman to enter the battlefield.
 Like Lena, the Legion demands Lex to give them some vacation time. During the meeting, Starro appears, and Captain Cold flushes him down the toilet despite Brainiac's warnings. They find out that Lena escaped to spend time at the beach with her boyfriend. Lex decides to fly the Legion to the beach to search for Lena, and inadvertently hurts Swamp Thing in the process.
 Green Arrow struggles to fly the invisible jet when Wonder Woman's knocked out.
 Doctor Fate's date takes a turn for the worse when an actual doctor is needed.
 Cyborg shows how he goes to the bathroom.
 At Green Arrow's funeral, Batman rants about how death works in the DC Universe.
 The Robot Chicken Nerd gets an internship at the Daily Planet.
 Aquaman talks with his date's pet fish to see if she's a keeper.
 The Legion arrives on the beach and uses the time to hang out and cause mischief. They discover that the Justice League is also on the beach and that Lena and Superboy are dating, much to the dismay of Lex, Superman, and both teams. Before a fight between the two sides happens, a mutated Starro returns on the beach to wreak havoc, forcing the heroes and villains to team up to stop him. Though Starro reconsiders his attack after seeing Lena and Superboy's love, he is defeated by Batman and Green Lantern's sailboat. Superman and Lex agree that they can't stop the power of love as the two sides attend the wedding of Gorilla Grodd and Bizarro. Lex reunites with his bandmates to perform as Sexx Luthor once more.

Voice cast 
 Seth Green as The Nerd, Batman, Robin, Aquaman, The Penguin, Ace the Bat-Hound, Jimmy Olsen, Darkseid, Scarecrow, Toyman, Doctor Fate, Cyborg, Clayface, Black Manta, Killer Croc, Banehound, Various
 Breckin Meyer as Superman, Bizarro
 Alfred Molina as Lex Luthor, Green Arrow
 Nathan Fillion as Green Lantern, Black Adam
 Hugh Davidson as Martian Manhunter, Seahorse Leader
 Alex Borstein as Wonder Woman
 Zac Efron as Superboy, Brainiac
 Sarah Hyland as Lena Luthor
 Clancy Brown as Gorilla Grodd
 Matthew Senreich as The Flash, Reverse-Flash, Weather Wizard, Waiter
 Clare Grant as Poison Ivy, Catwoman, Little Girl
 Paul Reubens as The Riddler, Sunbather
 Giovanni Ribisi as The Joker, Two-Face
 Kevin Shinick as Narrator, Captain Cold, Starro
 Tara Strong as Harley Quinn
 Zeb Wells as Sinestro, Swamp Thing

References 

Robot Chicken episodes
Animated films based on DC Comics
2014 American television episodes
Justice League in other media
Television episodes written by Geoff Johns
Superhero comedy films